The University of Central Punjab or UCP is a private university located on Khayaban-e-Jinnah Road, Lahore, Punjab, Pakistan.

Recognized university
University of Central Punjab is a part of the Punjab Group of Colleges. It was chartered by Government of the Punjab in 2002 and recognized by the Higher Education Commission (Pakistan).

According to the HEC ranking 2022, its business school is on seventh ranking in Lahore.

History
On 15 August 1996, The Punjab Group of Colleges petitioned Government of Punjab for the establishment of a university in the province. Punjab Institute of Computer Science (PICS), Punjab College of Commerce (PCC), Punjab Law College (PLC) and Punjab College of Information Technology (PCIT) formed the core of the university at the time of establishment.

Following a restructuring in 2004, the PCBA and PICS operate under the Faculty of Management Studies and Faculty of Information Technology of the University of Central Punjab respectively. The Punjab Colleges of Commerce and the Punjab Law College respectively function under the Faculties of Commerce and of Law of the University of Central Punjab. The Faculty of Engineering (FOE) was introduced in 2002.

Campus

The university is located opposite Shaukat Khanum Memorial Cancer Hospital & Research Centre on Khayaban-e-Jinnah road. It covers an area of 500,000 square feet. The campus was built in 2010 and consists of five blocks. There is an auditorium block consisting of 300 seats. It houses a number of facilities, both curricular and co-curricular in nature.

Library
The library of the university has an academic collection of more than 40,000 books from various disciplines being taught at the university. The collection in the library is arranged according to a specific classification scheme is known as Dewey Decimal Classification (DDC) scheme.

Academics
The university consists of the following faculties:
 Faculty of Engineering
 Faculty of Arts and Social Sciences
 Faculty of Pharmacy
 Faculty of Law
 School of Media and Communication Studies
 Faculty of Life Sciences
 Faculty of Information Technology

See also
 Muhammad Ali Jinnah University, Karachi
 University of Central Punjab, Lahore
 Capital University of Science & Technology, Islamabad
 Allied Schools

References

External links
 UCP official website
 

Engineering universities and colleges in Pakistan
Universities and colleges in Lahore
Punjab Group of Colleges
Private universities and colleges in Punjab, Pakistan
2002 establishments in Pakistan
Educational institutions established in 2002